Isabella Gregor (born in the 20th century) is an Austrian actress and theatre director.

Career 
Born in Vienna, Gregor comes from a family of musicians: her great uncle is the conductor Bertil Wetzelsberger, her mother was the singer Sieglinde Wetzelsberger, her father the conductor Karl Österreicher and her cousin the conductor Franz Welser-Möst. She completed her acting training with Susi Nicoletti.

She has appeared at the Salzburg Festival, the Wiener Festwochen, the Theater in der Josefstadt, the Volksbühne Berlin, the Nationaltheater Weimar, Schauspiel Frankfurt, Staatstheater Stuttgart and the Theater am Neumarkt in Zurich.

Since the 1990s, Gregor has worked as a director in drama and music theatre. In spoken theatre, she directed and adapted the German premiere of Oxygen by Carl Djerassi and Roald Hoffmann at the Mainfranken Theater Würzburg - with which she was nominated for the Bavarian Directing Prize and invited to various guest performances; she directed, among others.

She staged Mozart's Die Zauberflöte in 2014 as part of the Operklosterneuburg festival.

For one term she was a visiting dramatic teacher at Stanford University in the US.

References

External links 
 
 

Austrian stage actresses
Austrian theatre directors
Women theatre directors
1962 births
Living people
Actresses from Vienna